The Santa Rosa Rugby Club is a men's rugby union team based in and around Santa Rosa, California.  The club was founded in 1971.  The team plays in the Northern California Rugby Football Union at the Division I level. The Santa Rosa Rugby Club won back to back national championships in 1994–95.

References

External links

Rugby union teams in California